Limnognathia maerski is a microscopic freshwater animal, discovered living in warm springs on Disko Island, Greenland, in 1994. Since then, it was also found in Crozet Islands of Antarctica.

With an average length of 100 micrometers (μm), it is one of the smallest animals known.

Description

Feeding
L. maerski mainly feeds on bacteria, blue-green algae, and diatoms. It has very complicated jaws, with fifteen separate elements. The parts of the jaw structure are connected by ligaments and muscles. The jaw parts are very small, ranging from 4 μm to 14 μm. The animal can extend part of its jaw structure outside its mouth while eating. It also extends much of its jaw structure outside its mouth when it is regurgitating indigestible items.

Anatomy
L. maerski has a large ganglion, or 'brain', in its head, and paired nerve cords extending ventrally (along the lower side of the body) towards the tail. Stiff sensory bristles made up of one to three cilia are scattered about the body. These bristles are similar to ones found on gnathostomulids, but up to three cilia may arise from a single cell in L. maerski, while gnathostomulids never have more than one cilium per cell.

Flexible cilia are arranged in a horseshoe-shaped area on the forehead, and in spots on the sides of the head and in two rows on the underside of the body. The cilia on the forehead create a current that moves food particles towards the mouth. The other cilia move the animal.

Reproduction
All specimens of L. maerski that have been collected have had female organs. They lay two kinds of eggs: Thin-walled eggs that hatch quickly, and thick-walled eggs that are believed to be resistant to freezing, and thus capable of over-wintering and hatching in the spring. The same pattern is known from rotifers, where thick-walled eggs only form after fertilization by males. The youngest L. maerski specimens collected may also have male organs, and it is now theorized that the animals hatch as males and then become females (sequential hermaphroditism).

Taxonomy and phylogeny

Taxonomic status
Limnognathia maerski is nominally a platyzoan, but has variously been assigned as a class or subphylum in the clade Gnathifera or as a phylum in a Gnathifera superphylum, named Micrognathozoa. It is related to the rotifers and gnathostomulids, grouped together as the Gnathifera.

Phylogeny

Cladogram showing the relationships of Limnognathia:

The Gnathifera is the sister group of the spiralians, and is crucial to understand because of its relationship to animal evolution.

References

External links
  — Comprehensive information on L. maerski 

  — article on L. maerski

 

 

Microscopic animals
Platyzoa genera